99 Squadron or 99th Squadron may refer to:

 No. 99 Squadron RAAF, a unit of the Australian Royal Air Force 
 No. 99 Squadron RAF, a unit of the United Kingdom Royal Air Force 
 99th Airlift Squadron, a unit of the United States Air Force 
 99th Reconnaissance Squadron, a unit of the United States Air Force